Gavshan may refer to:
 Gavshan-e Olya
 Gavshan-e Sofla